Correbidia assimilis is a moth of the subfamily Arctiinae. It was described by Rothschild in 1912. It is found in Venezuela and possibly Central America.

References

Arctiinae
Moths described in 1912